George W. Turner (born 1910) was an English professional footballer who played as an outside left.

Career
Born in Mansfield, Turner spent his early career with Mansfield Athletic, Sneinton, Notts County, Luton Town and Everton. He made two league appearances for Everton in 1932 after joining them from Luton Town. He joined Bradford City from Everton in June 1934, making 16 league appearances for the club, before returning to Luton Town in June 1935. He later played for Northampton Town and Newark Town.

Sources

References

1910 births
Date of death missing
English footballers
Notts County F.C. players
Luton Town F.C. players
Everton F.C. players
Bradford City A.F.C. players
Carlton Town F.C. players
Northampton Town F.C. players
Newark Town F.C. players
English Football League players
Association football outside forwards
Footballers from Mansfield